Charles Henry Rabe (born May 6, 1932) is an American former professional baseball player. The left-handed pitcher and native of Boyce, Ellis County, Texas, appeared in 11 games in Major League Baseball for the – Cincinnati Redlegs.

Rabe graduated from Waxahachie High School, alma mater of prominent baseball manager and front-office executive Paul Richards, and began his 12-year, ten-season pro career in the Cincinnati organization in 1952. After winning  16 of 26 decisions in 1957 for the top-level Seattle Rainiers of the Pacific Coast League, he was recalled in September by the Redlegs and used in two games. In the second, on September 27, he started against the eventual world champion Milwaukee Braves at Milwaukee County Stadium and held them to only five hits and two runs, striking out six, in seven full innings pitched. But the Redlegs could not solve Milwaukee's ace right-hander, Lew Burdette, and went down to defeat, 2–1. He began 1958 with Cincinnati and worked in nine games, including his second and last start, May 25 against the St. Louis Cardinals at Crosley Field; however, he lasted only three innings, gave up eight hits and four runs, and absorbed the 4–2 defeat. He made only one more MLB appearance before returning to the minors for the remainder of his career, which lasted through 1963.

In his 11 games with Cincinnati, Rabe posted an 0–4 won–lost record and 3.67 earned run average, allowing 30 hits and nine bases on balls in 27 innings pitched. He struck out 16.

References

External links

Venezuelan Professional Baseball League statistics

1932 births
Ada Herefords players
Baseball players from Texas
Cincinnati Redlegs players
Columbia Reds players
Havana Sugar Kings players
Lawton Reds players
Leones del Caracas players
American expatriate baseball players in Venezuela
Living people
Macon Peaches players
Major League Baseball pitchers
Montreal Royals players
Nashville Vols players
People from Ellis County, Texas
Seattle Rainiers players
Syracuse Chiefs players
Toronto Maple Leafs (International League) players
Waxahachie High School alumni
American expatriate baseball players in Canada
American expatriate baseball players in Cuba